Kolmården Wildlife Park is a zoo that opened in 1965 overlooking Bråviken bay in Sweden. It is the largest zoo in Scandinavia, includes the first dolphinarium in Scandinavia, which opened in 1969 and has daily shows, and the world's first cable car safari. The wildlife park also has a birds of prey display and a seal show. In the Marine World area is a roller coaster called "The Dolphin Express". Another, larger, roller coaster in the park is Wildfire.

History 
The zoo was conceived in 1962 by Ulf Svensson as a means of reviving the Kolmården Municipality, and was opened in 1965 with 210 animals in residence.

The polar bear facility opened in 1968 with six polar bears—one of the largest polar facilities in the world. The dolphinarium opened in 1969, and in 1972 the zoo became home to brown bears. 1972 also saw the opening of the drive-through safari park, as well as the Tropicarium, which exhibited snakes and crocodiles, Located outside the entry of the zoo.

In 1993, the zoo opened Dolphin Lagoon. In 1997, the zoo was turned over from municipal ownership to private ownership. Bamses värld, devoted to the cartoon character Bamse, was opened in the following year.

Parks and Resorts Scandinavia took over operation of the zoo in 2001 and has since been making many changes. Tiger World, where visitors can get "scary close" to tigers, was completed in 2007, and in 2008, the dolphinarium was extended into a new Marine World. In 2009, a family friendly roller-coaster called "The dolphin express" (Delfinexpressen) opened in Marine World.

In 2006, a baby gorilla was born at Kolmården for the first time in history, making its birth the first of its kind in Sweden. The gorilla, called Enzo, was not accepted by his mother during the first period of his life and the zookeepers had to nurse him. Enzo was later reintroduced to his family, and in 2009, Enzo got a brother, called Echo.

The safari park that originally opened in 1972 was closed to drive-through visitors in 2010, but was replaced by a low-going cableway in 2011, called "Safari". The attraction consists of five areas with different themes and animals:
The highland: llamas and ibex
Forest of the bears: Eurasian brown bears
The Savannah: blackbuck, giraffes, common eland, gemsbok, wildebeest, ostriches, Ankole-Watusi, Grévy's zebras, lechwe, chital
The Scandinavian forest: red deer, moose, fallow deer, European bison
The Valley of Lions: African lions

On 17June, 2012, the park's grey wolves attacked and killed a zookeeper working alone in their enclosure.

In March 2014, Kolmården announced a new theme park area for younger children, the popular cartoon figure Bamse would get a whole new themed area with several attractions, including a smaller roller coaster due to open in 2015.

On 8April, 2014, the park announced their first major coaster investment, Wildfire, a Rocky Mountain Construction topper-track wooden coaster which opened in 2016.

Animals 
The zoo houses two Indian elephants given to the King of Sweden by Thailand. Kolmården Wildlife Park has the only gorillas, bottle-nosed dolphins, bush dogs, addax antelopes, oryx antelopes, Indian elephants, takin, Grévy's zebras, dholes, and ibex in Sweden.

The park has 11 dolphins : Nephele (F), Ariel (F), Lyra (F), Luna (F), David (M), Fenah (F), Pärma (F), Peach (F), Finn (M), Alana (F) and Neptun (M).

Deadly accidents 

During the years when public cars were allowed to drive through the Safari, occasionally people would step out from their cars to get better pictures, and in 1981 a man who left his car in the lion enclosure was killed by lions.

1991 elephant keeper Robert Nilsson was killed by the elephant Putschie, who probably had no intention to kill Nilsson, who was bringing four elephants from the enclosure to their stable. Unfortunately Nilsson was walking beside the "train" of elephants on the wrong side, between the elephants and the wall to the antelope stables, when the lead elephant Donkey suddenly turned around and attacked the second elephant Putschie, who crushed Robert Nilsson on the wall, when she was pushed by Donkey.

Between 1991 and 2012 paying visitor groups, with 8000  persons annually, were allowed to go into the wolf enclosure, as part of the project "Close contact with wolves". The project was terminated after a group of wolves killed the biologist and Zoo-Guide Karolina Bördin  The responsible Zoologist Mats Höggren was found guilty of severe neglect in his duty, and was given a suspended sentence and a fine, and Kolmården Wildlife Park had to pay the family a fine of 3,5 million SEK.

In 2007, television presenter Arne Wiese was attacked by a wolf when he was presenting the opening of a wolf enclosure at the wildlife park, but he survived the attack.

See also 
Kolmården Tropicarium, an aquarium and terrarium adjacent to the park

References

External links 
 
 
 Statistics on the Delfinexpressen roller coaster at Coasterpedia

Animal theme parks
Zoos in Sweden
Buildings and structures in Östergötland County
Tourist attractions in Östergötland County
1965 establishments in Sweden
Zoos established in 1965